Mike Power may refer to:

Mike Power (American football), American football quarterback
Mike Power (Australian footballer) (born 1955), Australian rules footballer